Rebecca Jane Williams (born July 28, 1988) is a Canadian corporate manager and former actress. A native of Liverpool, England, she immigrated to Canada at age four, attended Toronto's Malvern Collegiate Institute, and trained at Armstrong Acting Studios. In 2011, Williams was nominated for a Gemini Award (Best Performance by an Actress in a Leading Role in a Dramatic Program or Mini-Series) for Reviving Ophelia. Since 2013, she has been employed as an office manager for an energy service company in Calgary, Alberta.

Filmography

Awards and nominations

References

External links

Reviving Ophelia: The Challenge of Portraying an Abuse Victim by Rebecca Williams
Movie of Reviving Ophelia Looks at Struggles of Today's Teen Girls from Lincoln Journal Star

Living people
1988 births
Canadian television actresses
21st-century Canadian actresses
Actresses from Liverpool
British emigrants to Canada
Canadian film actresses
21st-century English women
21st-century English people